Ojala or ojalá may refer to:

Songs
 "Ojalá" (María Becerra song), 2022
 "Ojalá" (Ha*Ash song), 2017
 "Ojalá", a song by Paulo Londra
 "Ojalá", a song by Silvio Rodríguez from Al final de este viaje...
 "Ojalá", a song by Wisin & Yandel featuring Farruko from Los campeones del pueblo

Surname
 Ojala (surname)

Places
Ojala, California, an unincorporated community, United States

Miscellaneous 
 "Ojalá", a Spanish expression